William Anderson (1904 – 22 September 1990) was a Scottish-born Australian politician.

He was elected to the Tasmanian House of Assembly in 1964 as a Labor member for Wilmot. He served until his defeat in 1972.

References

1904 births
1990 deaths
Australian Labor Party members of the Parliament of Tasmania
Members of the Tasmanian House of Assembly
20th-century Australian politicians
Date of birth missing
British emigrants to Australia